Comair Flight 5191 (marketed as Delta Connection Flight 5191 under a codeshare agreement with Delta Air Lines) was a scheduled United States domestic passenger flight from Lexington, Kentucky, to Atlanta, Georgia.

The aircraft was assigned the airport's Runway 22 for the takeoff but used Runway 26 instead. Runway 26 was too short for a safe takeoff, causing the aircraft to overrun the end of the runway before it could become airborne. It crashed just past the end of the runway, killing all 47 passengers and two of the three crew. It was the second-deadliest accident involving the CRJ100/200; two years earlier, China Eastern Airlines Flight 5210 claimed 55 lives. 

The flight's first officer, James Polehinke, was the pilot flying at the time of the accident and was the sole survivor; however, Captain Jeffrey Clay was responsible for taxiing to the wrong runway. In the National Transportation Safety Board's report on the crash, investigators concluded that the likely cause of the crash was pilot error.

Flight details

The flight was marketed under the Delta Air Lines brand as Delta Connection Flight 5191 (DL5191) and was operated by Comair as Flight 5191. It was identified for air-traffic control and flight-tracking purposes as Comair 191 (OH5191/COM5191).

The flight had been scheduled to land at Hartsfield-Jackson Atlanta International Airport at 7:18 a.m.

The aircraft involved was a 50-seat Bombardier Canadair Regional Jet CRJ100ER, serial number 7472. It was manufactured in Canada and was delivered to the airline on January 30, 2001.

The captain was 35-year old Jeffrey Clay. He had 4,710 flight hours, including 3,082 hours on the CRJ100.

The first officer was 44-year-old James Polehinke. Prior to his employment by Comair, Polehinke worked for Gulfstream International as a captain. He had 6,564 flight hours, including 940 hours as a captain and 3,564 hours on the CRJ100.

Crash

Analysis of the cockpit voice recorder (CVR) indicated that the aircraft was cleared to take off from Runway 22, a  runway used by most airline traffic at Lexington. However, after confirming the takeoff clearance for Runway 22, Captain Clay taxied onto Runway 26, a much smaller and unlit runway that was not authorized for commercial use, and turned the controls over to First Officer Polehinke for takeoff. The air traffic controller was not required to maintain visual contact with the aircraft; after clearing the aircraft for takeoff, he turned to perform administrative duties and did not see the aircraft taxi to the runway.

At a speed approaching , Polehinke remarked, "That is weird with no lights" referring to the lack of lighting on Runway 26 – it was about an hour before daybreak.

Clay called for rotation, but the aircraft sped off the end of the runway before it could lift off. It then struck a low earthen wall adjacent to a ditch, becoming momentarily airborne, clipped the airport perimeter fence with its landing gear and smashed into trees, separating the fuselage and flight deck from the tail. The resulting fire destroyed the aircraft.

Passengers

Forty-nine of the 50 people on board perished in the accident (all 47 passengers and two of the three crew members); most of the victims died instantly, in the initial crash impact. Comair released the passenger manifest on August 29, 2006.

Most of the passengers were American citizens from the Lexington area, ranging in age from 16 to 72. They included a young couple who had been married the previous day and were traveling to California on their honeymoon.

Sole survivor
James Polehinke, the first officer, suffered serious injuries, including multiple broken bones, a collapsed lung and severe bleeding. Lexington-Fayette and airport police officers pulled Polehinke out of the wreckage. He underwent surgery for his injuries, including an amputation of his left leg that confined him to a wheelchair. Doctors later determined that Polehinke had suffered brain damage and had no memory of the crash or the events leading up to it.

Investigation

During the investigation, the Federal Aviation Administration (FAA) discovered that tower-staffing levels at Blue Grass Airport violated an internal policy as reflected in a November 16, 2005 memorandum requiring two controllers during the overnight shift: one in the tower working clearance, ground and tower frequencies, and another, either in the tower or remotely at Indianapolis Center, working TRACON (radar). At the time of the accident, the single controller in the tower was performing both tower and radar duties. On August 30, 2006, the FAA announced that Lexington, as well as other airports with similar traffic levels, would be staffed with two controllers in the tower around the clock, effective immediately.

Comair discovered after the accident that all of its pilots had been using an airport map that did not accurately reflect changes made to the airport layout during ongoing construction work. The National Transportation Safety Board (NTSB) later determined that this did not contribute to the accident. Construction work was halted after the accident on the orders of Fayette Circuit judge Pamela Goodwine in order to preserve evidence in the crash pending the inspection by safety experts and attorneys for the families of the victims.

The NTSB released several reports on January 17, 2007, including transcripts of the CVR and an engineering report.

In April 2007, acting on a recommendation made by the NTSB during its investigation of Comair 5191, the FAA issued a safety notice that reiterated advice to pilots to positively confirm their position before crossing the hold-short line onto the takeoff runway, and again when initiating takeoff. The NTSB made four further recommendations, three measures to avoid fatigue affecting the performance of air traffic controllers and one to prevent controllers from carrying out non-essential administrative tasks while aircraft are taxiing under their control. Although these recommendations were published during the course of the NTSB's investigation into the accident to Comair Flight 5191, they were in part prompted by four earlier accidents, and the board was unable to determine whether fatigue contributed to the Comair accident. In May, acting on another NTSB recommendation, the FAA advised that pilot training should include specific guidance on runway lighting requirements for takeoff at night. 

In July 2007, a Comair flying instructor testified that he would have failed both pilots for violating Sterile Cockpit Rules. Later that month, the NTSB released its final report, citing this "non-pertinent conversation" as a contributing factor in the accident.

Probable cause
During a public meeting on July 26, 2007, the NTSB announced the probable cause of the accident:

The National Transportation Safety Board determines that the probable cause of this accident was the flight crew members' failure to use available cues and aids to identify the airplane's location on the airport surface during taxi and their failure to cross-check and verify that the airplane was on the correct runway before takeoff. Contributing to the accident were the flight crew's nonpertinent conversations during taxi, which resulted in a loss of positional awareness and the Federal Aviation Administration's failure to require that all runway crossings be authorized only by specific air traffic control clearances.
NTSB investigators concluded that the likely cause of the crash was that Clay and Polehinke ignored clues that they were on the wrong runway, failed to confirm their position on the runway and engaged in too much conversation not pertinent to the flight, in violation of sterile cockpit procedures. 

Captain Clay's widow strongly disputes laying primary blame on the pilots, stating that other factors contributed, "including an under-staffed control tower and an inaccurate runway map."

Aftermath 
A memorial service for the victims was held on August 31, 2006, at the Lexington Opera House. A second public memorial service was held on September 10, 2006 at Rupp Arena in Lexington. The Lexington Herald-Leader published a list of the victims with short biographies.

The Flight 5191 Memorial Commission was established shortly after the crash to create an appropriate memorial for the victims, first responders and community that supported them. The commission chose the University of Kentucky Arboretum as its memorial site.

The Flight 5191 Memorial, created by Douwe Blumberg, consists of a sculpture of 49 stainless steel birds in flight over a base of black granite.

In July 2008, U.S. district judge Karl Forester ruled that Delta Air Lines could not be held liable for the crash, because although Comair is a wholly owned subsidiary of Delta, Comair maintains its own management and policies, and employs its own pilots.
In December of the following year, Forester granted a passenger family's motion for "partial summary judgment" determining, as a matter of law, that Comair's flight crew was negligent, and that this negligence was a substantial factor causing the crash of Flight 5191.

Runway 8/26 at Blue Grass Airport was closed in March 2009, and the new  Runway 9/27 opened on August 4, 2010. The new runway has been built on a separate location not connected to Runway 22.

Lawsuits 
Families of 45 of the 47 passengers sued Comair for negligence; families of the other two victims settled with the airline before filing litigation. Three sample cases were to be heard on August 4, 2008, but the trial was indefinitely postponed after Comair reached a settlement with the majority of the families. Comair sued the airport authority over its runway signs and markings as well as the FAA, which had only one air traffic controller on duty, contrary to a memo that it had previously issued requiring two workers on overnight shifts. The case against the airport authority was dismissed on sovereign immunity grounds, and this ruling was upheld by the Kentucky Supreme Court on October 1, 2009. In Comair's case against the United States, a settlement was reached with the government agreeing to pay 22% of the liability for the crash while Comair agreed to pay the remaining 78%.

All but one of the passengers' families settled their cases. After a four-day jury trial in Lexington that ended on December 7, 2009, the estate and daughters of 39‑year‑old victim Bryan Woodward were awarded compensatory damages in the amount of $7.1 million. Though Comair challenged this verdict as excessive, on April 2, 2010, Judge Forester overruled Comair's objections and upheld the verdict. The case, formally known as Hebert v. Comair, was set for a punitive damages jury trial on July 19, 2010. In that trial, a different jury was to decide whether Comair was guilty of gross negligence that was a substantial factor causing the crash and, if so, the punitive damages to assess. The decision to allow a jury trial was reversed in a later hearing, with the judge ruling that the company could not be punished for the "reprehensible conduct" of its pilots.

In May 2012, Polehinke filed a lawsuit against the airport and the company that designed the runway and taxi lights. The estates or families of 21 of the 47 passengers filed lawsuits against Polehinke. In response, Polehinke's attorney, William E. Johnson, raised the possibility of contributory negligence on the part of the passengers. When asked by the plaintiffs' attorney David Royse, who criticized the statements, to explain what that meant, Johnson replied that the passengers "should have been aware of the dangerous conditions that existed in that there had been considerable media coverage about the necessity of improving runway conditions at the airport."
At the time when Johnson submitted the contributory negligence defense, he had not yet been able to speak to Polehinke. By the time that newspapers reported on the court documents, Johnson said that he had already informed Royse that he would withdraw the argument.

Similar accidents and incidents
In 1993, a commercial jet at Blue Grass Airport was cleared for takeoff on Runway 22, but mistakenly took Runway 26 instead. Tower personnel noticed the mistake and canceled the aircraft's takeoff clearance just as the crew realized their error. The aircraft subsequently departed safely from Runway 22. An identical occurrence took place in January 2007 when a Learjet lined up on Runway 26, but again the error was noticed and corrected before the flight took off.

On October 31, 2000, the crew of Singapore Airlines Flight 006 mistakenly used a closed runway for departure from Chiang Kai-shek International Airport in Taipei, Taiwan. The Boeing 747-400 collided with construction equipment during the takeoff roll, resulting in the deaths of 83 of the 179 passengers and crew on board.

On October 31, 1979, at 5:42 a.m. CST (UTC−06:00), Western Airlines Flight 2605, a McDonnell Douglas DC-10, crashed at Mexico City International Airport in fog, after landing on a runway closed for maintenance. Flight 2605 remains the deadliest aviation disaster in Mexico City.

In popular culture 
The crash was featured in the third episode of Season 21 of Mayday, also known as Air Crash Investigation. The episode is titled "Tragic Takeoff". The flight's first officer, the crash's only survivor, was later featured in a film about sole survivors of plane crashes.

The opening skit of the 2006 Emmy Awards featured host Conan O'Brien getting into a plane crash similar to the TV show Lost. The Emmy's were airing the same night as the plane crash. The skit was criticized and called "tasteless."

See also

 Aviation safety
 List of accidents and incidents involving commercial aircraft
 List of sole survivors of airline accidents or incidents
 Western Airlines Flight 2605
Singapore Airlines Flight 006
China Airlines Flight 204

Notes

References

External links

 NTSB Final Report
Comair Press Releases (Archive)
Pictures of the wreckage (Archive)
 Cockpit Voice Recorder transcript and accident summary

2006 in Kentucky
Airliner accidents and incidents caused by pilot error
Accidents and incidents involving the Bombardier CRJ200
Airliner accidents and incidents in Kentucky
Airliner accidents and incidents involving runway overruns
Aviation accidents and incidents in the United States in 2006
5191
History of Lexington, Kentucky
August 2006 events in the United States